The Pasundan Christian Church ( - GKP) was officially established in Indonesia on .  It has 51 congregations and 33,000 members.  It is a member of the World Communion of Reformed Churches (WCRC).

The missionaries took a very antithetic attitude toward Islam and the Sundanese culture. The progress was very slow. Meanwhile, a Dutch layman collected some converts using less orthodox methods, with the forms of the Javanese magical learning. In 1885, these two streams united, and in 1934, when it had 4,000 members, a presbyterian synod was formed. In 1942, several hardships occurred, and lasted to the fifties because of the Islamic revolts. The church survived, and consolidated. It now runs several schools and hospitals.

Ecumenical institution memberships
The Pasundan Christian Church is a member of a number of ecumenical institutions, including the Communion of Churches in Indonesia (Persekutuan Gereja-gereja di Indonesia PGI), specifically: the Communion of Churches in Indonesia West Java Region (PGIW-JABAR), the Communion of Churches in Indonesia DKI Jakarta Region (PGIW-DKI Jakarta), the Communion of Churches in Indonesia Banten Region (PGIW-Banten), along with the Christian Conference of Asia (CCA, Konferensi Kristen Asia), the World Alliance of Reformed Churches (WARC, Aliansi Gereja-Gereja Reformasi Dunia), and the World Council of Churches (WCC, Dewan Gereja-Gereja Sedunia, since 1960).

Partner churches
The Pasundan Christian Church has collaborated with Basel Mission from Switzerland, the Protestant Church in the Netherlands (Gereja Protestan di Belanda, abbreviated PKN), and the Indonesia Christian Church (Gereja Kristen Indonesia, GKI) of the West Java Regional Synod.

It has also pioneered the establishment of the Indonesian Christian Teacher Education College, itself the forerunner of the Satya Wacana Christian University (SWCU, Universitas Kristen Satya Wacana), Salatiga.  Until now, it has sent its delegates to the Satya Wacana Christian Higher Education Foundation, which is the foundation that manages SWCU.

The Pasundan Christian Church has an ecumenical cooperation relationship with one of the presbyteral churches in South Korea, namely, the Presbyterian Church in the Republic of Korea (PROK).

See also
Religion in Indonesia

References
Citations

Further reading

External links
Gereja Kristen Pasundan Immanuel Karawang 

Reformed denominations in Indonesia
Organizations based in West Java
History of West Java